Sambia is a town located on the island of Mohéli in the Comoros.

References 

Populated places in Mohéli